The 2017 FBD Insurance League was an inter-county and third-level college gaelic football competition in the province of Connacht. All five Connacht county teams participated. Three college teams competed – Institute of Technology, Sligo, NUI Galway and Galway-Mayo Institute of Technology (GMIT). Galway were the winners. This was the last edition of the tournament to feature college teams.

Format

The teams are drawn into two groups of four teams. Each team plays the other teams in its group once, earning 2 points for a win and 1 for a draw. The two group winners play in the final. Games are 30 minutes a side.

Group stage

Group A

Group B

GMIT gave a walkover to Galway.

Final

References

FBD Insurance League
FBD Insurance League